This is a list of people buried at sea
 Jessie Buckland (1878–1939), New Zealand photographer, buried in the south Pacific Ocean after dying during voyage from England to New Zealand
 Horace Edgar Buckridge (1877–1903), English–born Australian soldier and explorer, buried at sea after dying during attempted voyage from New Zealand to London
 Obadiah Bush (1797–1851), prospector and businessman, buried at sea after dying during what he intended to be his final trip to the East Coast.
 John Carradine (1906–1988), prolific film actor, buried in the Southern California Bight
 Captain James Cook (1728–1779), Royal Navy officer and explorer buried at sea after being abducted and cannibalized by Hawaiians
 Francis Drake (1540–1596), English privateer buried with two ships off the coast of Portobelo after his failed invasion of Panama
 George Duff (1764–1805), Royal Navy admiral buried at sea after being killed in the Battle of Trafalgar.
 Frank Watson Dyson (1868–1939), British Astronomer Royal buried at sea during voyage between Australia and England.
 Zachary Hickes (d. 1771), Royal Navy first lieutenant aboard HMS Endeavour on its voyage to Australia
 Kealiiahonui (1800–1849), Kaua'i nobleman buried at sea in Pearl Harbor.
 Sir Arthur Kennedy (1809–1883), British colonial governor of Hong Kong and Queensland, buried in the Red Sea after dying on voyage to England.
 Kui Lee (1932–1966), American singer-songwriter.
 Christopher Levett (1586–1630), English explorer of modern–day New England, buried at sea after dying on voyage out of Massachusetts.
 William Lowndes (1782–1822), U.S. Congressman from South Carolina, buried in the Atlantic Ocean after dying en route to the United Kingdom.
 Osama bin Laden (1957–2011), Arab terrorist.
 Atholl MacGregor (1883–1945), Chief Justice of Hong Kong, buried in the Indian Ocean after dying aboard British hospital ship after Japanese internment
 James Charles Martin (1901–1915), Australian Army private, buried in the Mediterranean Ocean after dying aboard the HMHS Glenart Castle following the Gallipoli Campaign.
 Edwina Mountbatten, Countess Mountbatten of Burma (1901–1960), buried at sea from HMS Wakeful off the coast of Portsmouth.
 Naihekukui, Hawaiian admiral, buried at sea after dying in Valparaiso, Chile
 Michael Parks (1940–2017), American film actor
 Christian Ferdinand Schiess (1856–1884), Swiss Victoria Cross recipient and Natal Native Contingent corporal during the Anglo–Zulu War, buried at sea after dying aboard  HMS Serapis.
 Frederic John Walker (1896–1944), Royal Navy captain known for anti–submarine operations in the Battle of the Atlantic, buried from HMS Hesperus.
 Dennis Wilson (1944–1983), American musician and cofounder of the Beach Boys,
 Alan Young (1919–2016), British actor known for playing Wilbur Post in "Mister Ed" and voicing Scrooge McDuck.
 Zheng He (1371–1433/35), Chinese admiral known for treasure voyages commissioned by the Yongle Emperor under the Ming Dynasty.

People whose ashes were scattered or buried at sea 

 Bud Abbott (1897–1974)
 Stanley Adams (1915–1977)
 Aizong (1198–1234)
 Queen Aishwarya of Nepal  (1949–2001)
 Jack Albertson (1907–1981)
 Mabel Albertson (1901–1982)
 Barbara Jo Allen (1906–1974)
 Peter Allen (1944–1992)
 Robert Altman (1925–2006)
 Kirk Alyn (1910–1999)
 Dev Anand (1923–2011)
 Edward Andrews (1914–1985)
 Bobby Anderson (1933–2008)
 John Anderson (1922–1992)
 Roscoe Arbuckle (1887–1933)
 Neil Armstrong (1930–2012)
 Desi Arnaz (1917–1986)
 Sig Arno (1895–1975)
 Dorothy Arnold (1917–1984)
 Jean Arthur (1900–1991)
 Maureen Arthur (1934–2022)
 Hal Ashby (1929–1988)
 Malcolm Atterbury (1907–1992)
 Edith Atwater (1911–1986)
 James Avery (1945–2013)
 Raymond Bailey (1904–1980)
 Cleo Baldon (1927–2014)
 Lester Bangs (1948–1982)
 Lynn Bari (1919–1989)
 Saul Bass (1920–1996)
 Cheri Jo Bates (1948–1966)
 Orson Bean (1928–2020)
 Hugh Beaumont (1909–1982)
 Bruce Bennett (1906–2007)
 Maurice Béjart (1927–2007)
 Marcheline Bertrand (1950–2007)
 Carolyn Bessette–Kennedy (1966–1999)
 Krishna Prasad Bhattarai (1924–2011)
 Herbert Biberman (1900–1971)
 Clarence Birdseye (1886–1956)
 Birendra of Nepal (1945–2001)
 Joey Bishop (1918–2007)
 Kirti Nidhi Bista (1927–2017)
 Bill Bixby (1934–1993) (ashes scattered off Hana, Hawaii)
 Mari Blanchard (1923–1970)
 Betty Bobbitt (1939–2020)
 William E. Boeing (1881–1956)
 Dirk Bogarde (1921–1999)
 Jorge Bolet (1914–1990)
 Ward Bond (1903–1960)
 Richard Boone (1917–1981)
 Veda Ann Borg (1915–1973)
 Martin Bormann (1900–1945)
 David Bowie (1947–2016)
 Lee Bowman (1914–1979)
 Joseph Boxhall (1884–1967) (ashes scattered off Atlantic Ocean)
 Paul Bragg (1895–1976)
 Sybil Brand (1899–2004)
 Jocelyn Brando (1919–2005)
 Marlon Brando (1924–2004)
 Robert Bray (1917–1983)
 George Brent (1904–1979)
 Jean Brooks (1915–1963)
 Martin E. Brooks (1925–2015)
 James Brown (1920–1992)
 Phil Brown (1916–2006)
 Dik Browne (1917–1989)
 Cliff Burton (1962–1986)
 Edd Byrnes (1932–2020)
 Don Calfa (1939–2016)
 Maria Callas (1923–1977) (Her ashes were originally buried in the Père Lachaise Cemetery. After being stolen and later recovered, they were scattered into the Aegean Sea, off the coast of Greece on June 3, 1979)
 John Callahan (1953–2020)
 Pablito Calvo (1948–2000)
 Donald Cameron (1916–1961)
 Norman Campbell (1924–2004) (ashes sprinkled off Prince Edward Island)
 Olive Carey (1896–1988)
 George Carlin (1937–2008) (some of his ashes were scattered over Spofford Lake)
 Allen Carr (1934–2006)
 Anthony Caruso (1916–2003)
 Adriana Caselotti (1916–1997)
 Eva Cassidy (1963–1996)
 Jack Cassidy (1927–1976)
 Joan Caulfield (1922–1991)
 Christine Cavanaugh (1963–2014)
 Marge Champion (1919–2020)
 Dorothy Buffum Chandler (1901–1997)
 Norman Chandler (1899–1973)
 Ben Chapman (1928–2008) (ashes scattered off Hawaii and at Park Lake (Black Lagoon) at Universal Studios)
 Beth Chapman (1967–2019)
 Lonny Chapman (1920–2007)
 Julia Child (1912-2004) (ashes entombed in the Neptune Memorial Reef)
 Paul Cushing Child (1902-1994)
 David Christie (singer) (1948–1997)
 Chyna (1969–2016) (cremated and ashes scattered at the Pacific Ocean)
 Dick Clark (1929–2012)
 Fred Clark (1914–1968)
 Colin Clive (1900–1937)
 Alberto Closas (1921–1994)
 June Clyde (1909–1987)
 Kurt Cobain (1967–1994)
 Tris Coffin (1909–1990)
 Cyril Collard (1957–1993)
 William Collier Jr. (1902–1987)
 Christopher Collins (1949–1994)
 Jack Colvin (1934–2005)
 Chester Conklin (1886–1971)
 Sean Connery (1930–2020) (some of his ashes were scattered at sea near Bahamas)
 Brian Connolly (1945–1997)
 Pat Conway (1931–1981)
 Robert Coogan (1924–1978)
 Merian C. Cooper (1893–1973)
 Kevin Corcoran (1949–2015)
 Ted de Corsia (1903–1973)
 Carolina Cotton (1925–1997)
 Hazel Court (1926–2008)
 Wally Cox (1924–1973)
 Francis Crick (1916–2004)
 Mary Jane Croft (1916–1999)
 Joel Crothers (1941–1985)
 Georg Danzer (1946–2007) (cremated and his ashes scattered near Mallorca)
 Frankie Darro (1917–1976)
 Arthur Davis (1905–2000)
 Don S. Davis (1942–2008)
 Richard Deacon (1922–1984)
 Frances Dee (1909–2004)
 Philippe De Lacy (1917–1995)
 Deng Xiaoping (1904–1997)
 Deng Yingchao (1904–1992)
 Martin Denny (1911–2005)
 Lizzy Mercier Descloux (1956–2004)
 Tara Devi (1945–2006)
 Upendra Devkota (1953–2018)
 Dhirendra of Nepal (1950–2001)
 Dena Dietrich (1928–2020)
 Roy E. Disney (1930–2009)
 Phyllis Diller (1917–2012)
 Dipendra of Nepal (1971–2001)
 Lawrence Dobkin (1919–2002)
 Ahn Doo–hee (1917–1996)
 Brian Donlevy (1901–1972)
 Jeff Donnell (1921–1988)
 Ann Doran (1911–2000)
 Donald Wills Douglas Sr. (1892–1981)
 Robert Douglas (1909–1999)
 Robert Dowdell (1932–2018)
 Denise Dowse (1958–2022)
 Charles Drake (1917–1994)
 Joanne Dru (1922–1996)
 Ja'Net DuBois (1932, 1938, or 1945–2020)
 Eddy Duchin (1909–1951)
 Doris Duke (1912–1993)
 James Dunn (1901–1967)
 Ann (1942–1995) and Madelyn Dunham (1922–2008) (ashes were scattered on the south side of Oahu into the Pacific Ocean.)
 Ann Dvorak (1911–1979)
 Harry Earles (1902–1985)
 Buddy Ebsen (1908–2003)
 William Edmunds (1886–1981)
 Adolf Eichmann (1906–1962) (Following the 1962 execution in Israel of Eichmann, the Nazi responsible for overseeing the extermination of millions of Jews during the Holocaust, his body was cremated and his ashes scattered over the Mediterranean Sea in international waters because Israel did not want Eichmann buried on its soil or to have a grave anywhere else that might have become a place of pilgrimage for other Nazis.)
 James Ellison (1910–1993)
 Isobel Elsom (1893–1981)
 Friedrich Engels (1820–1895) (ashes scattered into the English Channel off Beachy Head)
 Zhou Enlai (1898–1976)
 Edith Evanson (1896–1980)
 Harold Farncomb (1899–1971)
 David Farrar (1908–1995) (ashes scattered into the Indian Ocean)
 Charles Fernley Fawcett (1915–2008)
 José Fernández (1992–2016)
 Virginia Field (1917–1992)
 John Fiedler (1925–2005)
 Bill Finger (1914–1974)
 Gail Fisher (1935–2000)
 Janet Flanner (1892–1978)
 Art Fleming (1924–1995)
 Joel Fluellen (1907–1990)
 Hans Frank (1900–1946)
 Thornton Freeland (1898–1987)
 Paul Frees (1920–1986) (ashes sprinkled into the Pacific Ocean)
 Victor French (1934–1989)
 Wilhelm Frick (1877–1946)
 Milton Friedman (1912–2006)
 Dan Fogelberg (1951–2007)
 Benson Fong (1916–1987)
 Henry Ford II (1917–1987)
 Mark Forest (1933–2022)
 Bob Fosse (1927–1987)
 Anne Francis (1930–2011)
 Elisabeth Fraser (1920–2005)
 Tom Fuccello (1936–1993)
 Jean Gabin (1904–1976)
 Anthony Galindo (1979–2020)
 Jerry Garcia (1942–1995)
 Erle Stanley Gardner (1889–1970)
 Doris Gates (1901–1987)
 Marvin Gaye (1939–1984)
 Charles Gaylord (1936–2009)
 Leyla Gencer (1928–2008) (cremated and ashes scattered off from Bosphorus)
 Lowell George (1945–1979)
 Hjördis Genberg (1919–1997)
 Charles Gérard (1922–2019)
 Betty Lou Gerson (1914–1999)
 Stan Getz (1927–1991)
 Jagadish Ghimire (1946–2013)
 Madhav Prasad Ghimire (1919–2020)
 Frances Gifford (1920–1994)
 Helen Gilbert (1915–1995)
 Virginia Gilmore (1919–1986)
 Tulsi Giri (1926–2018)
 Ned Glass (1906–1984)
 Mary Pat Gleason (1950–2020)
 Shyamala Gopalan (1938–2009)
 Hermann Göring (1893–1946)
 Michael Gough (1916–2011)  (ashes scattered into the English Channel)
 Cary Grant (1904–1986)
 Richard Greene (1918–1985)
 Charlotte Greenwood (1890–1977)
 Virginia Grey (1917–2004)
 Corinne Griffith (1894–1979)
 Woody Guthrie (1912–1967)
 Amber Gurung (1938–2016)
 Khem Raj Gurung (1975–2016)
 Don Haggerty (1914–1988)
 Alan Hale Jr. (1921–1990)
 Richard Hale (1892–1981)
 Alaina Reed Hall (1946–2009)
 Roy Halston (1932–1990)
 Rusty Hamer (1947–1990)
 Neil Hamilton (1899–1984)
 Sam Hanks (1914–1994)
 Yip Harburg (1896–1981)
 Hugh Harman (1903–1982)
 George Harrison (1943–2001)
 John Hart (1917–2009)
 Paul Hartman (1904–1973)
 Phil Hartman (1948–1998) (ashes scattered off from Santa Catalina Island's Emerald Bay)
 Walter de Havilland (1872–1968)
 Screamin' Jay Hawkins (1929–2000)
 Taylor Hawkins (1972–2022)
 Kenneth Hawks (1898–1930)
 Alexandra Hay (1947–1993)
 Sterling Hayden (1916–1986)
 Richard Haydn (1905–1985)
 Billie Hayes (1924–2021)
 Buddy Hayes (1916–1997)
 Jean Heather (1921–1995)
 Robert A. Heinlein (1907–1988) (cremated and ashes scattered in the Pacific Ocean)
 Pêr-Jakez Helias (1914–1995)
 Henrik, Prince Consort of Denmark (1934–2018)
 Gloria Henry (1923–2021)
 Rudolf Hess (1894–1987) (He was originally buried in Wunsiedel cemetery in Bavaria.  After his tomb became a potential pilgrimage place for neo–Nazis, his body was disinterred in July 2011, cremated, and the ashes scattered at sea.)
 David Hedison (1927–2019)
 Van Heflin (1908–1971)
 Jascha Heifetz (1901–1987)
 Doug Henning (1947–2000)
 William Henry (1914–1982)
 Jon-Erik Hexum (1957–1984)
 Anne T. Hill (1916–1999)
 Arthur Hill (1922–2006)
 Edmund Hillary (1919–2008) (ashes scattered in New Zealand's Hauraki Gulf)
 Barron Hilton (1927–2019)
 Pat Hingle (1924–2009)
 Alfred Hitchcock (1899–1980)
 Don Ho (1930–2007)
 William Holden (1918–1981)
 John Holmes (1944–1988)
 Sterling Holloway (1905–1992)
 John Houseman (1902–1988)
 Kenny Howard (1929–1992)
 Huell Howser (1945–2013)
 Ian Hugo (1898–1985)
 L. Ron Hubbard (1911–1986)
 Rochelle Hudson (1916–1972)
 Rock Hudson (1925–1985)
 Diana Hyland (1936–1977)
 Thomas H. Ince (1880–1924)
 Richard Jaeckel (1926–1997)
 Brion James (1945–1999)
 Joyce Jameson (1932–1987)
 Princess Jayanti of Nepal (1946–2001)
 Allen Jenkins (1900–1974)
 Isabel Jewell (1907–1972)
 Jiang Zemin (1926-2022)
 Joan of Arc (1412–1431)
 Alfred Jodl (1890–1946)
 Scatman John (1942-1999)
 Anissa Jones (1958–1976)
 Buck Jones (1891–1942)
 Buster Jones (1943–2014)
 Charlie Jones (1930–2008)
 Chuck Jones (1912–2002)
 Janis Joplin (1943–1970)
 Christine Jorgensen (1926–1989)
 Duke Kahanamoku (1890–1968)
 Lani Kai (1936–1999)
 Ernst Kaltenbrunner (1903–1946)
 Eddie Kamae (1927–2017)
 Israel Kamakawiwo'ole (1959–1997) (ashes sprinkled into the Pacific Ocean at Mākua Beach)
 Rishi Kapoor (1952–2020)
 Martha Karagianni (1939–2022)
 Kurt Kasznar (1913–1979)
 Kathryn Kates (1948–2022)
 Hari Bhakta Katuwal (1935–1980)
 Gilbert Lani Kauhi (1937–2004)
 Moe Keale (1939–2002)
 Eleanor Keaton (1918–1998)
 Kekāuluohi (1794–1845)
 Wilhelm Keitel (1882–1946)
 Sally Kellerman (1937–2022)
 DeForest Kelley (1920–1999)
 Graham Kennedy (1934–2005) (ashes sprinkled at Kiama)
 John F. Kennedy Jr. (1960–1999) (cremated at Mayflower Cemetery crematorium, Duxbury, Massachusetts, ashes sprinkled from USS Briscoe in the Atlantic Ocean off the coast of Martha's Vineyard)
 Barbara Kent (1907–2011)
 Sandy Kenyon (1922–2010)
 Klaus Kinski (1926–1991)
 Polly Klaas (1981–1993)
 Werner Klemperer (1920–2000)
 Girija Prasad Koirala (1924–2010)
 Sushil Koirala (1939–2016)
 Charles Korvin (1907–1998) 
 Henry Koster (1905–1988)
 Hans Krebs (1898–1945)
 Otto Kretschmer (1912–1998)
 Jacques Lacarrière (1925–2005)
 Devi Lal (1914–2001)
 Laura La Plante (1904–1996)
 Frankie Laine (1913–2007)
 Veronica Lake (1922–1973)
 Libertad Lamarque (1908–2000)
 Fernando Lamas (1915–1982)
 Elsa Lanchester (1902–1986)
 Victor Lanoux (1936–2017)
 George Lansbury (1859–1940)
 Ring Lardner Jr. (1915–2000)
 John Laurie (1897–1980) (ashes were scattered into the English Channel)
 Harry Lauter (1914–1990)
 John Phillip Law (1937–2008)
 Peter Lawford (1923–1984), actor, was cremated and ashes originally buried at Westwood Village Memorial Park Cemetery; they were later removed and sprinkled in the Pacific Ocean.
 Cloris Leachman (1926–2021)
 Bill Lear (1902–1978)
 Eppie Lederer (1918–2002)
 Vivien Leigh (1913–1967)
 Elliott Lewis (1917–1990)
 Charles Lindbergh Jr. (1930–1932)
 Larry Linville (1939–2000)
 Cleavon Little (1939–1992)
 Liu Xiaobo (1955–2017), 2010 Nobel Peace Prize Winner.
 Frank Loesser (1910–1969)
 Richard Long (1927–1974)
 Jack Lord (1920–1998)
 Delos W. Lovelace (1894–1967)
 Arthur Lubin (1898–1995)
 Sue Lyon (1946–2019)
 Frederica Sagor Maas (1900–2012)
 John D. MacArthur (1897–1978)
 Moyna Macgill (1895–1975)
 Jack MacGowran (1918–1973)
 Angus MacLise (1938–1979)
 Norma MacMillan (1921–2001) (ashes sprinkled off from Strait of Juan de Fuca)
 Meredith MacRae (1944–2000)
 Mahendra of Nepal (1920–1972)
 Jock Mahoney (1919–1989)
 Guillermo Marín (1905–1988)
 Michael Mark (1886–1975)
 Brenda Marshall (1915–1992)
 Adolfo Marsillach (1928–2002)
 Dick Martin (1922–2008)
 Elsa Martinelli (1935–2017)
 Zeppo Marx (1901–1979)
 Murray Matheson (1912–1985)
 Lester Matthews (1900–1975)
 Jenny Maxwell (1941–1981)
 Jacques Mayol (1927–2001)
 Patti McCarty (1921–1985)
 Lon McCallister (1923–2005)
 Mercedes McCambridge (1916–2004)
 Loren G. McCollom (1914–1982)
 Joel McCrea (1905–1990)
 Roddy McDowall (1928–1998)
 Dorothy McGuire (1916–2001)
 Charles McGraw (1914–1980)
 Dallas McKennon (1919–2009)
 Scott McKenzie (1939–2012)
 Charles McKimson (1914–1999)
 Bill McKinney (1931–2011)
 Kenneth McLennan (1925–2005)
 Addie McPhail (1905–2003)
 Steve McQueen (1930–1980)
 Kimo Wilder McVay (1927–2001)
 Patrick McVey (1910–1973) (ashes sprinkled into the Atlantic Ocean)
 George Meeker (1904–1984)
 Ib Melchior (1917–2015)
 Ismael Merlo (1918–1984)
 Don Messick (1926–1997), (ashes were sprinkled in the Pacific Ocean, at the Point Lobos State Reserve)
 Dorothy Meyer (1924–1987)
 Harvey Milk (1930–1978)
 Ray Milland (1907–1986)
 Nolan Miller (1933–2012)
 Mort Mills (1919–1993)
 Jessica Mitford (1917–1996)
 Pindale Min (1608–1661)
 Mary Miles Minter (1902–1984)
 Robert Mitchum (1917–1997)
 Peggy Moran (1918–2002)
 Marc Moreland (1958–2002)
 Toshia Mori (1912–1995)
 Patricia Morison (1915–2018)
 Karen Morley (1909–2003)
 Priscilla Morrill (1927–1994)
 Chester Morris (1901–1970)
 George Stephen Morrison (1919–2008)
 Jeff Morrow (1907–1993)
 Kirby Morrow (1973–2020)
 Douglas Mossman (1933–2021)
 Pranab Mukherjee (1935–2020)
 George Murdock (1930–2012)
 Dennis Murphy (1932–2005)
 Natalia Danesi Murray (1901–1994)
 Lorenzo Music (1937–2001)
 Jim Nabors (1930–2017)
 Laurence Naismith (1908–1992) (ashes sprinkled into the Pacific Ocean)
 George Nader (1921–2002)
 Jack Nance (1943–1996)
 Robert Nathan (1894–1985) and his wife Anna Lee (1913–2004)
 Tom Neal (1914–1972)
 Jawaharlal Nehru (1889–1964)
 Anaïs Nin (1903–1977)
 Prince Nirajan of Nepal (1978–2001)
 Bradley Nowell (1968–1996)
 George O'Brien (1899–1985)
 Donald O'Connor (1925–2003)
 Anita O'Day (1919–2006)
 Scott O'Dell (1898–1989)
 Odetta (1930–2008)
 Zelma O'Neal (1903–1989)
 J. Robert Oppenheimer (1904–1967)
 Admiral Sir Herbert Annesley Packer (1894–1962) (ashes scattered at sea off Cape Point, South Africa)
 Ali-Reza Pahlavi (1966–2011)
 Aloysius Pang (1990–2019)
 Al Parker (1952–1992)
 Eleanor Parker (1922–2013)
 Dennis Patrick (1918–2002)
 Gail Patrick (1911–1980)
 Shirley Patterson (1922–1995) (ashes sprinkled into the Atlantic Ocean)
 John Payne (1912–1989)
 Alice Pearce (1917–1966)
 Harold Peary (1908–1985)
 Sam Peckinpah (1925–1984)
 Christopher Pettiet (1976–2000)
 Dana Plato (1964–1999)
 Edward Platt (1916–1974)
 Khieu Ponnary (1920–2003)
 Olaf Pooley (1914–2015)
 Dudley Pound (1877–1943)
 Robert Preston (1918–1987)
 Vincent Price (1911–1993)
 Grigori Rasputin (1869–1916)
 Marguerite Ray (1931–2020)
 Ivan Rebroff (1931–2008)
 Helen Reddy (1941–2020)
 Orville Redenbacher (1907–1995)
 Roger Rees (1944–2015)
 Elliott Reid (1920–2013)
 Tommy Rettig (1941–1996)
 Walter Reuter (1906–2005)
 Alma Reville (1899–1982)
 Joachim von Ribbentrop (1893–1946)
 Florence Rice (1907–1974)
 Sogyal Rinpoche (1947–2019)
 Jerome Robbins (1918–1998)
 Rod La Rocque (1896–1969) and his wife Vilma Bánky (1901–1991)
 Richard Rodgers (1902–1979)
 Gilbert Roland (1905–1994)
 Ruth Roman (1922–1999)
 Alfred Rosenberg (1893–1946)
 Donald K. Ross (1910–1992)
 Russell Rouse (1913–1987)
 Jane Russell (1921–2011)
 Nipsey Russell (1918–2005)
 Herbert Ryman (1910–1989)
 Victoria Josefa Sackville–West (1862–1936)
 Don Sahlin (1928–1978)
 Gar Samuelson (1958–1999)
 George Sanders (1906–1972) (ashes sprinkled into the English Channel)
 Alice Sapritch (1916–1990)
 Fritz Sauckel (1894–1946)
 Jessica Savitch (1947–1983)
 Natalie Schafer (1900–1991)
 William Schallert (1922–2016)
 Maria Schneider (actress) (1952–2011)
 David Schramm (1946–2020)
 Bill Scott (1920–1985)
 Douglas Seale (1913–1999)
 Kate Seredy (1899–1975)
 Dr. Seuss (1904–1991)
 Arthur Seyss-Inquart (1892–1946)
 Princess Sharada Shah of Nepal (1942–2001)
 Ravi Shankar (1920–2012)
 Shubhendra Shankar (1942–1992)
 Bob Shane (1934–2020)
 Chandra Shekhar (1927–2007)
 Alan Shepard (1923–1998)
 Jean Shepherd (1921–1999) (ashes sprinkled into the Gulf of Mexico)
 Shree Krishna Shrestha (1967–2014)
 Princess Shruti of Nepal (1976–2001)
 Princess Shanti Singh of Nepal (1940–2001)
 Felix Silla (1937–2021)
 Vishwanath Pratap Singh (1931–2008)
 Norton Simon (1907–1993)
 Udham Singh (1899–1940)
 Joseph Siravo (1955 or 1957–2021)
 Edna Skinner (1921–2003)
 Alexis Smith (1921–1993)
 John Smith (1931–1995)
 Scott Smith (1948–1995)
 Gale Sondergaard (1899–1985)
 Sridevi (1963–2018) (cremated and ashes immersed in the sea off Rameshwaram coast in Chennai)
 Chris Stamp (1942–2012)
 Stefán Karl Stefánsson (1975–2018)
 Craig Stevens (1918–2002)
 Inger Stevens (1934–1970)
 Morgan Stevens (1951–2022)
 Martha Stewart (1922–2021)
 David Ogden Stiers (1942–2018)
 Uri Avnery (1923-2018)
 Jerry Stiller (1927–2020)
 Joseph Stilwell (1883–1946)
 Graeme "Shirley" Strachan (1952–2001)
 Susan Strasberg (1938–1999)
 Julius Streicher (1885–1946)
 Reinhard Suhren (1916–1984)
 Sak Sutsakhan (1928–1994)
 Dolph Sweet (1920–1985)
 Grady Sutton (1906–1995)
 Rabindranath Tagore (1861–1941)
 Lyle Talbot (1902–1996)
 Margaret Tallichet (1914–1991)
 Akim Tamiroff (1899–1972)
 Professor Tanaka (1930–2000)
 Norman Taurog (1899–1981)
 Rip Taylor (1931–2019)
 Bhakti Thapa (1741–1815)
 Surya Bahadur Thapa (1928–2015)
 Bill Thompson (1913–1971)
 Richard Thorpe (1896–1991)
 Paul Tibbets (1915–2007) (ashes sprinkled into the English Channel)
 Pat Tillman (1976–2004)
 Peter Tobin (1946–2022)
 Hideki Tojo (1884–1948)
 Regis Toomey (1898–1991)
 Erich Topp (1914–2005)
 Peter Tork (1942–2019)
 Alex Toth (1928–2006)
 Arthur Treacher (1894–1975) 
 Claire Trevor (1910–2000)
 Tribhuvan of Nepal (1906–1955)
 Ernest Truex (1889–1973)
 Lana Turner (1921–1995)
 Paul Twitchell (1908 or 1909–1971)
 Bishwonath Upadhyaya (1930–2014)
 Vivian Vance (1909–1979)
 Kelly Jean Van Dyke (1958–1991)
 Vanity (1959–2016)
 Monica Vitti (1931–2022)
 Wende Wagner (1941–1997)
 Roy Walford (1924–2004)
 Nancy Walker (1922–1992)
 Marcia Wallace (1942–2013)
 Charles Walters (1911–1982)
 Simon Ward (1941–2012) (ashes sprinkled into the English Channel)
 Virginia Weidler (1927–1968)
 William A. Wellman (1896–1975)
 H. G. Wells (1866–1946)
 Adam West (1928–2017)
 Brett Weston (1911–1993)
 Barry White (1944-2003) (ashes spread over the Pacific Ocean)
 Kenneth Whiting (1881–1943)
 James Whitmore (1921–2009)
 Andy Williams (1927–2012)
 Esther Williams (1921–2013)
 Guy Williams (1924–1989) (ashes sprinkled off Point Dume)
 John Williams (1903–1983)
 Robin Williams (1951–2014) (ashes sprinkled off San Francisco Bay)
 Flip Wilson (1933–1998)
 Ne Win (1911–2002)
 Eddie Van Halen (1955–2020)
 Archie Van Winkle (1925–1986)
 Edward Winter (1937–2001)
 Ed Wood (1924–1978)
 Katherine Woodville (1938–2013)
 Sam Yorty (1909–1998)
 Faron Young (1932–1996)
 Jon Zazula (1952–2022)
 Zhang Huaxiang (1987-2016)
 Harry von Zell (1906–1981)

References

 
Buried at sea
Sea